Alone in the Dark 3 is a 1995 survival horror video game developed and published by Infogrames Multimedia. It is the third installment of the Alone in the Dark video game series. The video game was released for MS-DOS in 1995. It was ported to the PC-98 later that year. Versions for Windows and Mac OS were also released in 1996 under the name of Alone in the Dark: Ghosts in Town.

Plot
It's 1925 and after Edward Carnby's success in his previous two investigations, a journalist has nicknamed him the 'Supernatural Private Eye'. This time, he is called to investigate the disappearance of a film crew at a two-bit ghost town known by the name of Slaughter Gulch located in the Mojave Desert in California. Among the disappeared crew is Emily Hartwood, Jeremy Hartwood's niece from the original. Edward soon discovers that a curse has gripped the town, and an evil cowboy from the Badlands named Jed Stone is the villain who is responsible for the crew's disappearance. Lurking around town are many trigger-happy sharpshooters, deranged prospectors, and bloodthirsty lost souls whom Edward must ward off with both his strength and his wit.

Gameplay
The main theme of this game is the Wild West, as Carnby is pitted against a town filled with "zombie cowboy outlaws" who attack him with revolvers and lever-action rifles. More traditionally mindless, shambling zombies begin to appear about midway through the game. Towards the end of the game, the concept of radioactive mutation plays a significant role in the story, and the player ends up fighting monstrous creatures created from the radiation.

Release
This was the first game in the series not to be released on floppy disks. Rather, it was released as a CD-ROM game since the initial release, with full Red Book audio soundtrack and dialogue speech (in English, French, German, Spanish, Italian, Japanese and Portuguese, depending on the country the game was released, and with the Mac version specifically featuring a different English dub) like the CD-ROM re-releases of the previous two games. It was also the first game in the series to be exclusively released for several computer formats and therefore it didn't receive any official console release unlike the previous two games.

Outside of Europe, the game was distributed in North America by Interplay Entertainment. In Japan, a PC-98 version of the game was developed and released in 1995 by AMT Savan Corps, a merge of the company previously known as Arrow Micro-Techs Corp which published the previous games for Japanese computers. There was no FM-Towns version developed this time. In 1996, the Windows and Mac OS versions were also released in Japan by Electronic Arts Victor as Alone in the Dark 3: Ghosts in Town.

The official guide to the game (Alone in the Dark 3: The Official Strategy Guide, Prima Publishing, 1995; re-released by the author, 2019) was written by Steve Schwartz in cooperation with Infogrames.

A 3DO Interactive Multiplayer version of Alone in the Dark 3 was announced but never released.

Reception

See also
 Undead Nightmare, another horror Western video game

References

External links

1995 video games
Cancelled 3DO Interactive Multiplayer games
Infogrames games
Alone in the Dark
DOS games
NEC PC-9801 games
Classic Mac OS games
Video game sequels
Video games set in 1926
Video games set in California
Western (genre) video games
Windows games
Video games about zombies
1990s horror video games
Video games with pre-rendered 3D graphics
Games commercially released with DOSBox
Video games developed in France